is the 15th single by Japanese idol girl group Nogizaka46. The center position of the title track is held by Asuka Saito. It was released on July 27, 2016. The song became number-one on the weekly Oricon Singles Chart, with 728,189 copies sold. It was also number-one on the Billboard Japan Hot 100.

Release 
This single was released in 5 versions. Type-A, Type-B, Type-C, Type-D and a regular edition. Type-A includes Mai Shiraishi's solo song Offshore Girl and its music video was shot in Guam.

The center position in the choreography for the title song is held by Asuka Saitō. In the group's variety show Nogizaka Kōjichū, she visited Kyaiktiyo Pagoda in Myanmar where her mother's birthplace and prayed for the hit of the single.

Music video 
The music video for the title track was shot in Nago and Ginoza in Okinawa Prefecture. It was directed by Takeshi Maruyama who also directed their documentary film Kanashimi no Wasurekata: Documentary of Nogizaka46 in 2015.

Track listing 
All lyrics written by Yasushi Akimoto.

Regular Edition

Type-A

Type-B

Type-C

Type-D

Participating members

Hadashi De Summer 
3rd Row: Hinako Kitano, Minami Hoshino, Yumi Wakatsuki, Rina Ikoma, Miona Hori, Himeka Nakamoto

2nd Row: Kazumi Takayama, Misa Etō, Sayuri Matsumura, Manatsu Akimoto, Reika Sakurai

1st Row: Nanami Hashimoto, Nanase Nishino, Asuka Saitō , Mai Shiraishi, Erika Ikuta

Chart and certifications

Weekly charts

Year-end charts

Certifications

References

Further reading

External links 
 Discography  on Nogizaka46 Official Website
 

2016 singles
2016 songs
Japanese-language songs
Nogizaka46 songs
Oricon Weekly number-one singles
Billboard Japan Hot 100 number-one singles
Song articles with missing songwriters
Songs with lyrics by Yasushi Akimoto